The 15th South American Junior Championships in Athletics were held in Medellín, Colombia from June 9–12, 1983.

Participation (unofficial)
Detailed result lists can be found on the "World Junior Athletics History" website.  An unofficial count yields the number of about 162 athletes from about 8 countries:  Argentina (29), Bolivia (1), Brazil (50), Chile (14), Colombia (45), Peru (4), Uruguay (2), Venezuela (17).

Medal summary
Medal winners are published for men and women
Complete results can be found on the "World Junior Athletics History" website.

Men

Women

Medal table (unofficial)

References

External links
World Junior Athletics History

South American U20 Championships in Athletics
1983 in Colombian sport
South American U20 Championships
International athletics competitions hosted by Colombia
1983 in youth sport